Hymenorrhaphy or hymen reconstruction surgery is the temporary surgical restoration of the hymen. The term comes from the Greek words hymen meaning "membrane", and raphḗ meaning "suture". It is also known as hymenoplasty, although strictly this term would also include hymenotomy.

Such procedures are not generally regarded as part of mainstream gynecology, but are available from some plastic surgery centers, particularly in the United States, Middle East, South Korea and Western Europe, generally as outpatient surgery. The normal aim is to cause bleeding during post-nuptial intercourse, which in some cultures is considered proof of virginity.

Operation 

A purely cosmetic procedure in which a membrane without blood supply is created, sometimes including a gelatine capsule of an artificial bloodlike substance. This operation is intended to be performed within a few days before an intended marriage.

Availability and legality 

Some hymen reconstruction operations are legal in some countries, while other countries ban all hymenorrhaphy. For example, in 2020 in the Netherlands the professional surgeon associations adjusted their codes to prohibit hymenorrhaphy, and the government stated it would consider a legal ban if practice continues. The number of women undergoing the operation in the country at the time was estimated as several hundreds per year. The United Kingdom criminalised the procedure (referred to as "hymenoplasty") even with consent, along with aiding and abetting it or offering to carry it out, with the Health and Care Act 2022. The same Act also banned virginity testing.

The operation is popular in Middle Eastern countries, in particular in Iran, where women are expected to keep virginity until their wedding night. Grand Ayatollah Sayyid Sadeq Rohani has issued a fatwa which permits hymenorrhaphy and considers a woman after the operation to be virgin.

See also

References

External links 
 Pediatrics article discusses healing of hymen injuries.
 NewHymen.dk – information and counselling on hymen surgery in the context of tradition and family pressure

Female genital modification
Plastic surgery
Gynecological surgery
Hymen